

Peerage of England

|rowspan="5"|Duke of Cornwall (1337)||none||1509||1511||
|-
|Henry Tudor||1511||1511||Died, and the Dukedom lapsed to the Crown
|-
|none||1511||1514||
|-
|Henry Tudor||1514||1514||Died, and the Dukedom lapsed to the Crown
|-
|none||1514||1537||
|-
|Duke of Buckingham (1444)||Edward Stafford, 3rd Duke of Buckingham||1485||1521||
|-
|Duke of Norfolk (1483)||Thomas Howard, 2nd Duke of Norfolk||1514||1524||Restored
|-
|Duke of Suffolk (1514)||Charles Brandon, 1st Duke of Suffolk||1514||1545||Viscount Lisle in 1513
|-
|Marquess of Dorset (1475)||Thomas Grey, 2nd Marquess of Dorset||1501||1530||
|-
|Earl of Arundel (1138)||Thomas FitzAlan, 17th Earl of Arundel||1487||1524||
|-
|rowspan="2"|Earl of Oxford (1142)||John de Vere, 13th Earl of Oxford||1485||1513||Died
|-
|John de Vere, 14th Earl of Oxford||1513||1526||
|-
|Earl of Salisbury (1337)||Margaret Pole, Countess of Salisbury||1513||1539||Restored
|-
|Earl of Westmorland (1397)||Ralph Neville, 4th Earl of Westmorland||1499||1549||
|-
|Earl of Northumberland (1416)||Henry Percy, 5th Earl of Northumberland||1489||1527||
|-
|Earl of Shrewsbury (1442)||George Talbot, 4th Earl of Shrewsbury||1473||1538||
|-
|Earl of Essex (1461)||Henry Bourchier, 2nd Earl of Essex||1483||1540||
|-
|Earl of Kent (1465)||Richard Grey, 3rd Earl of Kent||1505||1524||
|-
|Earl of Surrey (1483)||Thomas Howard, 1st Earl of Surrey||1483||1491||Restored as Duke of Norfolk, see above
|-
|Earl of Derby (1485)||Thomas Stanley, 2nd Earl of Derby||1504||1521||
|-
|Earl of Wiltshire (1510)||Henry Stafford, 1st Earl of Wiltshire||1510||1523||New creation
|-
|rowspan="2"|Earl of Devon (1511)||William Courtenay, 1st Earl of Devon||1511||1511||New creation; died
|-
|Henry Courtenay, 2nd Earl of Devon||1511||1538||
|-
|Earl of Worcester (1514)||Charles Somerset, 1st Earl of Worcester||1514||1526||New creation
|-
|rowspan="2"|Baron de Ros (1264)||George Manners, 11th Baron de Ros||1512||1513||Abeyance terminated in 1512; Died
|-
|Thomas Manners, 12th Baron de Ros||1513||1543||
|-
|Baron FitzWalter (1295)||Robert Radcliffe, 10th Baron FitzWalter||1506||1542||
|- 
|Baron FitzWarine (1295)||John Bourchier, 11th Baron FitzWarin||1479||1539||
|- 
|rowspan="4"|Baron Grey de Wilton (1295)||Edmund Grey, 9th Baron Grey de Wilton||1498||1511||Died
|-
|George Grey, 10th Baron Grey de Wilton||1511||1515||Died
|-
|Thomas Grey, 11th Baron Grey de Wilton||1515||1518||Died
|-
|Richard Grey, 12th Baron Grey de Wilton||1518||1520||
|-
|rowspan="3"|Baron Clinton (1299)||John Clinton, 7th Baron Clinton||1488||1514||Died
|- 
|Thomas Clinton, 8th Baron Clinton||1514||1517||Died
|- 
|Edward Clinton, 9th Baron Clinton||1517||1585||
|- 
|Baron De La Warr (1299)||Thomas West, 8th Baron De La Warr||1476||1525||
|- 
|Baron Ferrers of Chartley (1299)||Walter Devereux, 10th Baron Ferrers of Chartley||1501||1558||
|- 
|Baron de Clifford (1299)||Henry Clifford, 10th Baron de Clifford||1485||1523||
|- 
|rowspan="2"|Baron Morley (1299)||Alice Parker, 9th Baroness Morley||1489||1518||Died
|- 
|Henry Parker, 10th Baron Morley||1518||1556||
|- 
|Baron Strange of Knockyn (1299)||Joan le Strange, 9th Baroness Strange||1470||1514||Died; Title succeeded by the Earl of Derby, and held by his heirs until 1594, when it fell into abeyance
|- 
|Baron Zouche of Haryngworth (1308)||John la Zouche, 7th Baron Zouche||1468||1526||
|- 
|Baron Audley of Heleigh (1313)||John Tuchet, 8th Baron Audley||1512||1557||Abeyance terminated in 1512
|- 
|rowspan="2"|Baron Cobham of Kent (1313)||John Brooke, 7th Baron Cobham||1464||1512||Died
|- 
|Thomas Brooke, 8th Baron Cobham||1512||1529||
|- 
|Baron Willoughby de Eresby (1313)||William Willoughby, 11th Baron Willoughby de Eresby||1499||1526||
|- 
|Baron Dacre (1321)||Thomas Fiennes, 8th Baron Dacre||1486||1534||
|- 
|Baron FitzHugh (1321)||George FitzHugh, 7th Baron FitzHugh||1487||1513||Died, Barony fell into abeyance
|- 
|rowspan="2"|Baron Greystock (1321)||Elizabeth Dacre, 6th Baroness Greystoke||1487||1516||Died
|- 
|William Dacre, 7th Baron Greystoke||1516||1563||
|- 
|Baron Harington (1326)||Cecily Bonville, 7th Baroness Harington||1460||1530||
|- 
|rowspan="3"|Baron Scrope of Masham (1350)||Henry Scrope, 9th Baron Scrope of Masham||Aft. 1502||1512||Died
|- 
|Ralph Scrope, 10th Baron Scrope of Masham||1512||1515||Died
|- 
|Geoffrey Scrope, 11th Baron Scrope of Masham||1515||1517||Died, Barony fell into abeyance
|- 
|Baron Botreaux (1368)||Mary Hungerford, 5th Baroness Botreaux||1477||1529||
|- 
|Baron Scrope of Bolton (1371)||Henry Scrope, 7th Baron Scrope of Bolton||1506||1533||
|- 
|rowspan="2"|Baron Lumley (1384)||Richard Lumley, 4th Baron Lumley||1508||1510||
|- 
|John Lumley, 5th Baron Lumley||1510||1545||
|- 
|Baron Bergavenny (1392)||George Nevill, 5th Baron Bergavenny||1492||1536||
|- 
|Baron Berkeley (1421)||Maurice Berkeley, 4th Baron Berkeley||1506||1523||
|- 
|Baron Latimer (1432)||Richard Neville, 2nd Baron Latimer||1469||1530||
|- 
|Baron Dudley (1440)||Edward Sutton, 2nd Baron Dudley||1487||1532||
|- 
|rowspan="2"|Baron Lisle (1444)||Elizabeth Grey, 5th Baroness Lisle||1504||1519||Died
|- 
|Elizabeth Grey, 6th Baroness Lisle||1519||1525||
|- 
|Baron Saye and Sele (1447)||Edward Fiennes, 5th Baron Saye and Sele||1501||1528||
|- 
|Baron Stourton (1448)||William Stourton, 5th Baron Stourton||1487||1523||
|- 
|Baron Berners (1455)||John Bourchier, 2nd Baron Berners||1474||1533||
|- 
|Baron Hastings de Hastings (1461)||George Hastings, 3rd Baron Hastings||1506||1544||
|- 
|rowspan="2"|Baron Herbert (1461)||Elizabeth Somerset, Baroness Herbert||1490||1514||Died
|- 
|Henry Somerset, 4th Baron Herbert||1514||1548||
|- 
|rowspan="2"|Baron Ogle (1461)||Ralph Ogle, 3rd Baron Ogle||1485||1513||Died
|- 
|Robert Ogle, 4th Baron Ogle||1513||1530||
|- 
|Baron Mountjoy (1465)||William Blount, 4th Baron Mountjoy||1485||1534||
|- 
|Baron Dacre of Gilsland (1473)||Thomas Dacre, 2nd Baron Dacre||1485||1525||
|- 
|Baron Grey of Powis (1482)||Edward Grey, 3rd Baron Grey of Powis||1504||1552||
|- 
|Baron Daubeney (1486)||Henry Daubeney, 2nd Baron Daubeney||1507||1548||
|- 
|Baron Willoughby de Broke (1491)||Robert Willoughby, 2nd Baron Willoughby de Broke||1502||1521||
|- 
|Baron Ormond of Rochford (1495)||Thomas Butler, 1st Baron Ormond of Rochford||1495||1515||Died, Barony fell into abeyance
|- 
|Baron Conyers (1509)||William Conyers, 1st Baron Conyers||1509||1524||
|- 
|Baron Darcy de Darcy (1509)||Thomas Darcy, 1st Baron Darcy de Darcy||1509||1538||
|- 
|Baron Montagu (1514)||Henry Pole, 1st Baron Montagu||1513||1539||New creation
|-
|Baron Monteagle (1514)||Edward Stanley, 1st Baron Monteagle||1514||1523||New creation
|-
|}

Peerage of Scotland

|Duke of Rothesay (1398)||James Stewart, Duke of Rothesay||1512||1513||
|-
|Duke of Albany (1456)||John Stewart, Duke of Albany||1515||1536||Restored
|-
|Duke of Ross (1514)||Alexander Stewart, Duke of Ross||1514||1515||New creation; died, title extinct
|-
|rowspan=2|Earl of Sutherland (1235)||John de Moravia, 9th Earl of Sutherland||1508||1514||Died
|-
|Elizabeth de Moravia, 10th Countess of Sutherland||1514||1535||
|-
|rowspan=2|Earl of Angus (1389)||Archibald Douglas, 5th Earl of Angus||1463||1513||Died
|-
|Archibald Douglas, 6th Earl of Angus||1513||1557||
|-
|rowspan=3|Earl of Crawford (1398)||John Lindsay, 6th Earl of Crawford||1495||1513||Died
|-
|Alexander Lindsay, 7th Earl of Crawford||1513||1517||Died
|-
|David Lindsay, 8th Earl of Crawford||1517||1542||
|-
|Earl of Menteith (1427)||Alexander Graham, 2nd Earl of Menteith||1490||1537||
|-
|Earl of Huntly (1445)||Alexander Gordon, 3rd Earl of Huntly||1501||1524||
|-
|rowspan=2|Earl of Erroll (1452)||William Hay, 4th Earl of Erroll||1507||1513||Died
|-
|William Hay, 5th Earl of Erroll||1513||1541||
|-
|rowspan=2|Earl of Caithness (1455)||William Sinclair, 2nd Earl of Caithness||1476||1513||Died
|-
|John Sinclair, 3rd Earl of Caithness||1513||1529||
|-
|rowspan=2|Earl of Argyll (1457)||Archibald Campbell, 2nd Earl of Argyll||1493||1513||Died
|-
|Colin Campbell, 3rd Earl of Argyll||1513||1529||
|-
|rowspan=2|Earl of Atholl (1457)||John Stewart, 1st Earl of Atholl||1457||1512||Died
|-
|John Stewart, 2nd Earl of Atholl||1512||1521||
|-
|rowspan=2|Earl of Morton (1458)||John Douglas, 2nd Earl of Morton||1493||1513||Died
|-
|James Douglas, 3rd Earl of Morton||1513||1548||
|-
|rowspan=3|Earl of Rothes (1458)||George Leslie, 2nd Earl of Rothes||1490||1513||Died
|-
|William Leslie, 3rd Earl of Rothes||1513||1513||Died
|-
|George Leslie, 4th Earl of Rothes||1513||1558||
|-
|Earl Marischal (1458)||William Keith, 3rd Earl Marischal||1483||1530||
|-
|Earl of Buchan (1469)||John Stewart, 3rd Earl of Buchan||1505||1551||
|-
|Earl of Glencairn (1488)||Cuthbert Cunningham, 3rd Earl of Glencairn||1490||1541||
|-
|rowspan=2|Earl of Bothwell (1488)||Adam Hepburn, 2nd Earl of Bothwell||1508||1513||
|-
|Patrick Hepburn, 3rd Earl of Bothwell||1513||1556||
|-
|rowspan=2|Earl of Lennox (1488)||Matthew Stewart, 2nd Earl of Lennox||1495||1513||Died
|-
|John Stewart, 3rd Earl of Lennox||1513||1526||
|-
|Earl of Moray (1501)||James Stewart, 1st Earl of Moray||1501||1544||
|-
|Earl of Arran (1503)||James Hamilton, 1st Earl of Arran||1503||1529||
|-
|rowspan=2|Earl of Montrose (1503)||William Graham, 1st Earl of Montrose||1503||1513||Died
|-
|William Graham, 2nd Earl of Montrose||1513||1571||
|-
|Earl of Eglinton (1507)||Hugh Montgomerie, 1st Earl of Eglinton||1507||1545||
|-
|rowspan=2|Earl of Cassilis (1509)||David Kennedy, 1st Earl of Cassilis||1509||1513||Died
|-
|Gilbert Kennedy, 2nd Earl of Cassilis||1513||1527||
|-
|rowspan=2|Lord Erskine (1429)||Robert Erskine, 4th Lord Erskine||1509||1513||de jure Earl of Mar; died
|-
|John Erskine, 5th Lord Erskine||1513||1552||de jure Earl of Mar
|-
|Lord Somerville (1430)||John Somerville, 4th Lord Somerville||1491||1523||
|-
|Lord Haliburton of Dirleton (1441)||Janet Haliburton, 7th Lady Haliburton of Dirleton||1502||1560||
|-
|Lord Forbes (1442)||John Forbes, 6th Lord Forbes||1493||1547||
|-
|rowspan=2|Lord Maxwell (1445)||John Maxwell, 4th Lord Maxwell||1485||1513||Died
|-
|Robert Maxwell, 5th Lord Maxwell||1513||1546||
|-
|Lord Glamis (1445)||John Lyon, 6th Lord Glamis||1505||1528||
|-
|Lord Lindsay of the Byres (1445)||Patrick Lindsay, 4th Lord Lindsay||1497||1526||
|-
|Lord Saltoun (1445)||Alexander Abernethy, 4th Lord Saltoun||1505||1527||
|-
|rowspan=2|Lord Gray (1445)||Andrew Gray, 2nd Lord Gray||1469||1514||Died
|-
|Patrick Gray, 3rd Lord Grayy||1514||1541||
|-
|rowspan=2|Lord Sinclair (1449)||Henry Sinclair, 3rd Lord Sinclair||1487||1513||Died
|-
|William Sinclair, 4th Lord Sinclair||1513||1570||
|-
|Lord Fleming (1451)||John Fleming, 2nd Lord Fleming||1494||1524||
|-
|rowspan=2|Lord Seton (1451)||George Seton, 3rd Lord Seton||1508||1513||Died
|-
|George Seton, 6th Lord Seton||1513||1549||
|-
|rowspan=2|Lord Borthwick (1452)||William Borthwick, 3rd Lord Borthwick||1484||1513||Died
|-
|William Borthwick, 4th Lord Borthwick||1513||1542||
|-
|Lord Boyd (1454)||Robert Boyd, 4th Lord Boyd||Aft. 1508||1558||
|-
|rowspan=2|Lord Oliphant (1455)||John Oliphant, 2nd Lord Oliphant||1498||1516||Died
|-
|Laurence Oliphant, 3rd Lord Oliphant||1516||1566||
|-
|rowspan=2|Lord Livingston (1458)||William Livingston, 4th Lord Livingston||1503||1518||Died
|-
|Alexander Livingston, 5th Lord Livingston||1518||1553||
|-
|Lord Cathcart (1460)||John Cathcart, 2nd Lord Cathcart||1497||1535||
|-
|Lord Lovat (1464)||Thomas Fraser, 2nd Lord Lovat||1500||1524||
|-
|rowspan=2|Lord Innermeath (1470)||Thomas Stewart, 2nd Lord Innermeath||1489||1513||Died
|-
|Richard Stewart, 3rd Lord Innermeath||1513||1532||
|-
|Lord Carlyle of Torthorwald (1473)||William Carlyle, 2nd Lord Carlyle||1501||1524||
|-
|rowspan=2|Lord Home (1473)||Alexander Home, 3rd Lord Home||1506||1516||
|-
|George Home, 4th Lord Home||1516||1549||
|-
|Lord Ruthven (1488)||William Ruthven, 1st Lord Ruthven||1488||1528||
|-
|rowspan=3|Lord Crichton of Sanquhar (1488)||Robert Crichton, 2nd Lord Crichton of Sanquhar||1494||1513||Died
|-
|Robert Crichton, 3rd Lord Crichton of Sanquhar||1513||1516-20||Died
|-
|Robert Crichton, 4th Lord Crichton of Sanquhar||1516-20||1536||
|-
|rowspan=2|Lord Drummond of Cargill (1488)||John Drummond, 1st Lord Drummond||1488||1519||Died
|-
|David Drummond, 2nd Lord Drummond||1519||1571||
|-
|rowspan=2|Lord Hay of Yester (1488)||John Hay, 2nd Lord Hay of Yester||1508||1513||Died
|-
|John Hay, 3rd Lord Hay of Yester||1513||1543||
|-
|rowspan=2|Lord Sempill (1489)||John Sempill, 1st Lord Sempill||1489||1513||Died
|-
|William Sempill, 2nd Lord Sempill||1513||1552||
|-
|rowspan=2|Lord Herries of Terregles (1490)||Andrew Herries, 2nd Lord Herries of Terregles||1505||1513||Died
|-
|William Herries, 3rd Lord Herries of Terregles||1513||1543||
|-
|Lord Ogilvy of Airlie (1491)||James Ogilvy, 3rd Lord Ogilvy of Airlie||1506||1524||
|-
|rowspan=2|Lord Ross (1499)||John Ross, 2nd Lord Ross||1501||1513||Died
|-
|Ninian Ross, 3rd Lord Ross||1513||1556||
|-
|rowspan=2|Lord Avondale (1500)||Andrew Stewart, 1st Lord Avondale||1500||1513||Died
|-
|Andrew Stewart, 2nd Lord Avondale||1513||1549||
|-
|rowspan=2|Lord Elphinstone (1509)||Alexander Elphinstone, 1st Lord Elphinstone||1509||1513||Died
|-
|Alexander Elphinstone, 2nd Lord Elphinstone||1513||1547||
|-
|}

Peerage of Ireland

|rowspan=2|Earl of Kildare (1316)||Gerald FitzGerald, 8th Earl of Kildare||1478||1513||Died
|-
|Gerald FitzGerald, 9th Earl of Kildare||1513||1534||
|-
|rowspan=2|Earl of Ormond (1328)||Thomas Butler, 7th Earl of Ormond||1478||1515||Died
|-
|Piers Butler, 8th Earl of Ormond||1515||1539||
|-
|Earl of Desmond (1329)||Maurice FitzGerald, 9th Earl of Desmond||1487||1520||
|-
|Earl of Waterford (1446)||George Talbot, 4th Earl of Waterford||1473||1538||
|-
|Viscount Gormanston (1478)||William Preston, 2nd Viscount Gormanston||1503||1532||
|-
|Baron Athenry (1172)||Meiler de Bermingham||1500||1529||
|-
|Baron Kingsale (1223)||David de Courcy, 15th Baron Kingsale||1505||1520||
|-
|Baron Kerry (1223)||Edmond Fitzmaurice, 10th Baron Kerry||1498||1543||
|-
|Baron Barry (1261)||John Barry, 12th Baron Barry||1500||1530||
|-
|rowspan=2|Baron Slane (1370)||Christopher Fleming, 8th Baron Slane||1492||1517||Died
|-
|James Fleming, 9th Baron Slane||1517||1578||
|-
|Baron Howth (1425)||Nicholas St Lawrence, 4th Baron Howth||1485||1526||
|-
|rowspan=2|Baron Killeen (1449)||Edmond Plunkett, 4th Baron Killeen||1469||1510||Died
|-
|John Plunkett, 5th Baron Killeen||1510||1550||
|-
|rowspan=2|Baron Trimlestown (1461)||Christopher Barnewall, 2nd Baron Trimlestown||1470||1513||Died
|-
|John Barnewall, 3rd Baron Trimlestown||1513||1538||
|-
|Baron Dunsany (1462)||Edward Plunkett, 4th Baron of Dunsany||1500||1521||
|-
|Baron Delvin (1486)||Richard Nugent, 1st Baron Delvin||1486||1537||
|-
|}

References

 

Lists of peers by decade
1510s in England
1510s in Ireland
16th century in England
16th century in Scotland
16th century in Ireland
16th-century English nobility
16th-century Scottish peers
16th-century Irish people
Peers